John Moran may refer to:

John Moran (cellist) (born 1963), American musician and musicologist
John Moran (composer) (born 1965), American composer
John Moran (geneticist), American scientist 
John Moran (Medal of Honor) (1830–1905), American soldier
John Moran (photographer) (1831–1902), American photographer and artist
John Moran (rugby league), Australian rugby league footballer
John A. Moran (born 1932), American businessman
John B. Moran (1859–1909), American politician, District Attorney of Suffolk County, Massachusetts
John E. Moran (1856–1930), Philippine-American War Medal of Honor recipient
John Edward Moran (1897–1962), American politician, mayor of Burlington, Vermont
John P. Moran, member of the Los Angeles, California, Common Council
Jack Moran (1906–1959), English footballer
Jack Moran (Australian footballer) (1919–1979), Australian rules footballer
Jack Moran (boxer) (1894–1966), American boxer
Jack Moran (broadcaster) (1920–1997), American sportscaster
Jackie Moran (1923–1990), American actor

See also
John Moran Bailey (1904–1975), American political figure
John Wilson, 2nd Baron Moran (1924–2014), British soldier and diplomat